Earhart House, also known as Earhart Farm #2 and Walters Farm, is a historic home located near Ellett, Montgomery County, Virginia.  The house was built about 1856, and is a two-story, frame dwelling with an integral two-story rear ell.   It has a central passage plan.  The front facade features a one-story porch with a hipped roof.  Also on the property is a contributing -story log house or kitchen.

It was listed on the National Register of Historic Places in 1989.

References

Houses on the National Register of Historic Places in Virginia
Houses completed in 1856
Houses in Montgomery County, Virginia
National Register of Historic Places in Montgomery County, Virginia